Greggio is an Italian surname. Notable people with the surname include:

Ezio Greggio (born 1954), Italian comedian, actor, writer, and film director
Simonetta Greggio (born 1961), Italian novelist who writes in French

Italian-language surnames
be:Грэджа
ru:Греджо